The 2023 Phoenix Rising FC season is the club's tenth season in the USL Championship and their seventh as Rising FC.

Competitions

Friendlies
All times from this point on Mountain Standard Time (UTC-07:00)

USL Championship

Results by round

Matches

U.S. Open Cup

As a member of the USL Championship, Phoenix Rising will enter the tournament proper in the Second Round.

Roster

Player transactions

Loan in

Loan out

Statistics
As of March 19, 2923

Goalkeepers

References

2023
Phoenix Rising FC
Phoenix Rising FC
Phoenix Rising FC
Phoenix Rising FC